Diocese of Cuba may refer to:
Episcopal Church of Cuba, a diocese of the Episcopal Church
Missionary Diocese of Cuba, a diocese of the Reformed Episcopal Church in the Anglican Church in North America